Peter Short may refer to:

 Peter Short (clergyman) (born 1948), Canadian minister and former Moderator of the United Church of Canada
 Peter Short (field hockey) (born 1976), Canadian field hockey player
 Peter Short (printer) (died 1603), English printer
 Peter Short (rugby union) (born 1979), English rugby union player
 Peter Short (footballer) (1944–1984), English footballer
 Peter Short, West Indies Cricket Board president, 1993–1996